Xysticus texanus is a species of crab spider in the family Thomisidae. It is found in the United States and Mexico.

References

Thomisidae
Articles created by Qbugbot
Spiders described in 1904
Spiders of the United States
Spiders of Mexico